Fichtl is a German-language surname. Notable people with this surname include:

Jiří Fichtl (1921-2003), Czech chess player
 (1902-1989), Sigmund Freud's housekeeper, the author of memoirs about Freud's family

Fictional characters
Michael Fichtl from German TV series Tatort

See also